Molophilus pleuralis is a species of fly in the family Limoniidae. It is found in the  Palearctic.

References

External links
Images representing Molophilus at BOLD

Limoniidae
Insects described in 1920
Nematoceran flies of Europe